Cryptanthus bahianus is a plant species in the genus Cryptanthus.

Cultivars 
 Cryptanthus 'Autumn Glow'
 Cryptanthus 'Blonde'
 Cryptanthus 'Jean Stagner'
 Cryptanthus 'Lubbersianus'
 Cryptanthus 'Pie Crust'
 Cryptanthus 'Purple Whirl'
 × Cryptbergia 'Red Burst'
 × Cryptbergia 'Rubra'

References 
BSI Cultivar Registry Retrieved 11 October 2009

bahianus